Bulvar Dmitriya Donskogo is a Moscow Metro station in the Severnoye Butovo District, South-Western Administrative Okrug, Moscow, Russia. It is the southern terminus of the Serpukhovsko-Timiryazevskaya line.

Bulvar Dmitriya Donskogo, which opened in December 2002, is the newest station of the line. It was named for the street on which it is situated, which, in turn, is named for Dmitry Donskoy. It is also the first station of the system built outside the MKAD beltway encircling most of the city.

The station offers transfers to Ulitsa Starokachalovskaya station of the Butovskaya line leading further south.

Design
There are two vestibules for station access. The second floor of the station is flanked with black and white marble. It features thick black columns with light grey ceiling tiles. A strip of green marble encases the outside of the second-level balconies, as viewed from the lower level of the station. Black, grey, and red granite adorn the floors. There are stairs connecting the platform and the upper level of the station.

References

Moscow Metro stations
Railway stations in Russia opened in 2002
Serpukhovsko-Timiryazevskaya Line
Railway stations located underground in Russia